A constitutional referendum was held in Tunisia on 26 May 2002. The amendments to the constitution would abolish the three-term limit for incumbent presidents and raise the age limit of a sitting president from 70 to 75. A second parliamentary chamber (Chamber of Advisors) was introduced.

The changes were reportedly approved by 99.52% of voters, with a 95.59% voter turnout, but the results were denounced by the opposition as a masquerade.

Results

References

2002 referendums
2002 in Tunisia
Referendums in Tunisia
Constitutional referendums
Reelection
May 2002 events in Africa